Jatayu Earth Center, also known as Jatayu Nature Park or Jatayu Rock, is a park and tourism centre at Chadayamangalam in Kollam district of Kerala. It stands at an altitude of 350m (1200ft) above the mean sea level. Jatayu Nature Park holds the distinction of having the world’s largest bird sculpture, which is of Jatayu.

It was sculpted by Rajiv Anchal.

This rock-theme nature park was the first Public–private partnership tourism initiative in the state of Kerala under the BOT model.

After completion, it became accessible to visitors on 17 August 2018.

Origins
The park located near the town of Chadayamangalam (Jatayumangalam), which was named for Jatayu.  Jatayu was a  demi-god in Ramayana (a Hindu epic) who had the form of a vulture. 

According to the epic, Ravana was attempting to abduct Sita to Lanka when Jatayu tried to rescue her. Jatayu fought valiantly with Ravana, but as Jatayu was very old Ravana soon defeated him, clipping his wings, and Jatayu fell onto the rocks in Chadayamangalam. Rama and Lakshmana while on the search for Sita, chanced upon the stricken and dying Jatayu, who informed them of the battle with Ravana and told them that Ravana had headed South.

The park

The Statue 

The statue is a representation of a legend, and symbolizes the protection of women, and their honour and safety. It was designed and sculpted by Rajiv Anchal.

Dimensions

Jatayu Museum
The statue houses the construction of the Jatayu museum.
Jatayu,Chadayamangalam

Adventure Park 
The Park, on Adventure rock hill, opened on 5 December 2017.

Cave Resort
Jatayu is said to have taken refuge in a cave after his battle with Ravana. An Ayurvedic and Siddha cave resort is under construction and will offer ayurvedic healing paired with tales of Jatayu.

Dedication 
The park opened to visitors on 4 July 2018 and was soft-inaugurated by Pinarayi Vijayan, Chief Minister of Kerala. The park's first phase was worth  and included the adventure zone having  radius. On 29 November 2015, Dubai Corporation for Tourism and Commerce's Director of stakeholder relations, Majid Al Marri visited the under construction Jatayu Nature Park along with the then Chief Minister of Kerala, Mr. Oommen Chandy.

Access and attributes

Location and access 
The park is located on a hilltop in Kollam district in Kerala. No special transportation is required to get into the park. 

To reach the top, where Jatayu's sculpture is present, visitors can either take the 826 steps walkway up the hill, or take a cable car.

An additional paid ticket is required for cable car route.

There is a security screening process on the way to the top.

Cameras and bags are allowed. Food is not allowed. Water is allowed, but not in a plastic bottle.

Free filtered water is available at the top. There are multiple cafes present throughout the route.

Inscriptions and plaques 
A plaque outside the museum pays tribute to the fallen Jatayu, in a poem translated by K. Jayakumar, was dedicated by Pinarayi Vijayan, the Chief minister of Kerala.
"Stand atop this hill for a while in contemplation
 Here is where Jatayu fell
 Trying to block with his talons and beak
 The alien gnome who seized in deceit
 The priceless pearl of a daughter..."

Gallery

References

External links 

Tourist attractions in Kollam district
Adventure parks
Jatayu
Buildings and structures in Kollam
2018 sculptures
2018 establishments in Kerala
Buildings and structures completed in 2018
Architecture in India
Museums in Kerala
Outdoor sculptures in India
Places in the Ramayana